Ruth Waterbury (December 6, 1896, Rensselaer, New York – March 23, 1982, Newbury Park, California) was an American film critic and writer, best known for her work with Photoplay and Silver Screen magazines, and later, the Los Angeles Examiner, and The New York Daily News.

She was a critic and writer on Hollywood films for over 50 years, and was president of the Hollywood Women's Press Club five times. In the 1960s she published two biographies on Elizabeth Taylor and Richard Burton: Elizabeth Taylor: Her Life, Her Loves, Her Future (1961) and Richard Burton: His Intimate Story (1965).

Waterbury died in 1982, aged 85, and interred at Forest Lawn Memorial Park in the Hollywood Hills.

References

1896 births
1982 deaths
American film critics
20th-century American biographers
American women biographers
20th-century American women writers
20th-century American non-fiction writers
People from Rensselaer, New York
American women film critics
Writers from California
Historians from New York (state)